It's Hard to Find a Friend is the debut full-length album by Pedro the Lion. It was originally released on November 3, 1998 on Made in Mexico records. A re-mastered version of the original recording was released on October 16, 2001 on Jade Tree Records.

Track listing
All songs written by David Bazan
"Of Up and Coming Monarchs"  – 3:00
"The Longer I Lay Here"  – 3:04
"Big Trucks"  – 2:32
"Suspect Fled the Scene"  – 3:56
"Bad Diary Days"  – 4:01
"The Longest Winter"  – 4:12
"When They Really Get to Know You They Will Run"  – 2:34
"Of Minor Profits and Their Prostitute Wives"  – 2:48
"The Bells"  – 4:09
"Secret of the Easy Yoke"  – 6:41
"The Well"  – 3:31
"Promise"  – 2:19

Personnel
David Bazan · vocals, guitar, drums
Johnathon Ford · bass

References

Pedro the Lion albums
1998 debut albums
2001 debut albums
Jade Tree (record label) albums